Andari Bandhuvaya is a 2010 Telugu-language film. It received Akkineni Award for best home-viewing feature film for the year 2010. It was directed by Chandra Siddartha. The story and dialogues was written by popular Telugu novelist Balabhadrapatruni Ramani. It is a low budget movie which did well overseas. At box office it couldn't get good collections initially but it met slow success. It was dubbed into Tamil as Gokulam (2012). It was dubbed into Hindi as "Danveer 2".

Plot
Andari Bandhuvaya is a sincere attempt to highlight the importance of human values in today's society. Movie shows two types of environments starts with city shifts to village and then shifts to city. Nandu is simple man who helps and lives in simple manner, he watches all as his family members. Paddu belongs to a poor family and feeds her family with a normal job. She is optimistic and straight forward. Accidentally she visits hero's village. She watches values of village. Her behavior and conduct changes.

Cast
Sharwanand as Nandu
Padmapriya as Paddu
Naresh as Nandu's father
Vijay Sai as Nandu's friend
 V. Ramakrishna as Jangaiah 
Hari Teja as Paddu's elder sister
M S Narayana
Pragathi as Paddu's mother
 Priyanka Nalkari as Priyanka, Paddu's younger sister
 Aryan as NRI
 Surya
Krishna Bhagawan
Jeeva
Anand

Soundtrack

The Music Was Composed By Anup Rubens and Released by T-Series. All Lyrics were penned by Chaitanya Prasad.

Awards
Nandi Award for Akkineni Award for Best Home-viewing Feature Film - Chandra Siddhartha

References

External links
 

2010 films
Films based on novels
2010s Telugu-language films
2010 drama films
Indian drama films
Films scored by Anoop Rubens